Paul Fraisse (20 March 1911 – 12 October 1996) was a French psychologist known his work in the field of perception of time.

Biography 

Fraisse did not go directly into psychology but initially planned to become a Jesuit priest. These plans were abandoned owing to poor health. Nevertheless, Fraisse resumed philosophical studies at the Catholic University of Lyon, still hoping to prepare for the priesthood. A faculty member suggested that he go to the Catholic University of Louvain where experimental psychology had an important place in the Institute of Philosophy. There he spent 1935-37 as laboratory assistant to Professor Albert Michotte, doing experiments on visual perception and preparing for examinations in philosophy. In 1937 Fraisse began to give courses in psychology at the Catholic University of Lyon but would live in Paris where Professor Henri Pieron, on the recommendation of Michotte, took Fraisse into his laboratory. 

In 1952, Fraisse took over from Henri Piéron as director of the Laboratoire de Psychologie Experimentale.

In 1965, Fraisse became the director of the Institute of Psychology of the University of Paris, which grouped together psychologists from the University of Paris, the College de France, and the Ecole Pratique des Hautes Etudes. He created new diplomas there: abnormal psychology, educational psychology, industrial psychology, and experimental psychology.

In 1966, he founded the International Journal of Psychology.

Private Life 

Fraisse was the husband of Simone Fraisse (1913-2004), and the father of feminist philosopher Geneviève Fraisse and three other children.

Bibliography 
 Manuel pratique de psychologie expérimentale. Paris, 1956.
 Les Structures rythmiques: Etude psychologique. Louvain, 1956.
 Psychologie du temps. Paris, 1957.
 Traité de psychologie expérimentale, Paris, Presses universitaires de France, 1963, 1re éd., 9 vol. (Paul Fraisse and Jean Piaget)

References

1911 births
1996 deaths
French psychologists
Foreign associates of the National Academy of Sciences
20th-century French psychologists